St John's College, Cambridge awards honorary fellowships to people who have distinguished themselves in various walks of life.

Thomas Adès
Sir Richard Aikens
Sir Edward Appleton
Sir John Ball
Sir Jack Beatson
Mike Brearley
John Browne, Baron Browne of Madingley
Dan Burt
Peter Carnley
Sir Bryan Cartledge
Manuel Castells
Louis Cha
Owen Chadwick
Charles Corfield
Sir David Cox
Nigel Crisp, Baron Crisp
Richard Eberhart
Jennifer Egan
Marc Feigen
Richard Goldstone
Richard Goody
Hugh Griffiths, Baron Griffiths
Andrew D. Hamilton
David Harvey
Peter Hennessy, Baron Hennessy of Nympsfield
David Hope, Baron Hope of Craighead
Sir David Hopwood

Sir John Horlock
Frank Iacobucci
Sir Derek Jacobi
Andrew Jacovides
Simon Keenlyside
Mervyn King, Baron King of Lothbury
Sir Harpal Kumar
Sir Tim Lankester
Dame Louise Makin
Eric Maskin
Sir Jonathan Miller
Sir Mark Moody-Stuart
Bernard Ntahoturi
Robin Orr
Sir Roger Palin
Sir Roger Penrose
J. G. A. Pocock
David Pountney
Colin Renfrew, Baron Renfrew of Kaimsthorn
Abdus Salam
Sir Michael Scholar
Manmohan Singh
Jane Stapleton
Sir Douglas Wass
Sir David Wilson

References

Honorary Fellows of the College

Fellows of St John's College, Cambridge
St John's College, Cambridge
Saint John's College